Zoo is an American drama television series based on the 2012 novel of the same name by James Patterson and Michael Ledwidge, the former of who also serves as an executive producer. The series primarily stars James Wolk, Kristen Connolly, Nonso Anozie, Nora Arnezeder and Billy Burke as a group of varied professionals who investigate the mysterious pandemic of violent animals attacks upon humans all over the world. Zoo premiered on June 30, 2015 on CBS.

On October 23, 2017, CBS announced that the series was canceled.

Series overview

Episodes

Season 1 (2015)

Season 2 (2016)

Season 3 (2017)

Ratings

References

External links
 

Lists of American drama television series episodes